Hastings is a rural locality in the local government area of Huon Valley in the South-east region of Tasmania. The 2016 census has a population of 44 for the state suburb of Hastings.

History
Hastings was gazetted as a locality in 1966.

Geography
The southern boundary is formed by Mesa Creek, Lune River, and the shores of Hastings Bay. Hastings Caves State Reserve is in the north-west of the locality.

Climate

Road infrastructure
The C635 route (Hastings Caves Road) enters from the east and runs generally west and north-west until it reaches the Hastings Caves State Reserve, where it ends.

References

Localities of Huon Valley Council
Towns in Tasmania